Vitellariopsis is a group of plants in the family Sapotaceae described as a genus in 1915. The genus is native to eastern and southern Africa.

species

 Vitellariopsis cuneata (Engl.) Aubrév. - Usambara Mts in Tanzania
 Vitellariopsis dispar (N.E.Br.) Aubrév. - Eswatini, KwaZulu-Natal
 Vitellariopsis ferruginea Kupicha - Zimbabwe
 Vitellariopsis kirkii (Baker) Dubard - Nampula, Tanzania, Kenya
 Vitellariopsis marginata (N.E.Br.) Aubrév. - Mozambique, Eswatini, South Africa

References

 
Sapotaceae genera
Flora of Africa
Taxonomy articles created by Polbot
Taxa named by Henri Ernest Baillon